The 1931–32 Southern Conference men's basketball season consisted of a record 23 member institutions. The regular season champions were Maryland and Kentucky. They each had .900%. The tournament champion was Georgia.

Southern Conference standings

Conference Tournament
The tournament was seeded so that no team would face a school that they had faced in the regular season in the first round of the tournament.

First round
Mississippi and South Carolina did not participate
Atlanta, Georgia
February 26, 1932
Virginia 20, Alabama 16
North Carolina 35, Tennessee 25
Duke 44, Vanderbilt 32
Kentucky 50, Tulane 30
Florida 39, Maryland 24
Auburn 34, North Carolina State 33
Georgia 48, Mississippi State 26
Louisiana State 36, Georgia Tech 33

Quarterfinals
February 27, 1932
Duke 33, Florida 22
North Carolina 43, Kentucky 42
Auburn 30, Louisiana State 22
Georgia 40, Virginia 19

Semifinals
February 29, 1932
North Carolina 52, Auburn 31
Georgia 43, Duke 32

Championship
March 1, 1932
Georgia 26, North Carolina 24

All-Tournament team

First Team
Tom Alexander, North Carolina
T.W. Lumpkin, Auburn
Bill Strickland, Georgia
Virgil Weathers, North Carolina
Leroy Young, Georgia

Second Team
Louis Berger, Maryland
Wilmer Hines, North Carolina
Forest Sale, Kentucky
Vernon Smith, Georgia
James Thompson, Duke

References